The Nationalist Party was the continuation of the Irish Parliamentary Party (IPP), and was formed after the partition of Ireland, by the Northern Ireland-based members of the IPP.

History
Despite conventionally being referred to as a single organisation, the party long existed only as a loose network of small groups, generally operating in a single constituency.  Its candidates for both Westminster and Stormont elections were selected by conventions organised on a constituency basis.  These arrangements changed in 1966, when a single organisation covering the whole of Northern Ireland was established.

The Nationalist Party did not enter the first House of Commons of Northern Ireland despite winning six seats in the 1921 general election. Leader Joe Devlin took his seat shortly after the 1925 general election and his colleagues followed gradually by October 1927. Intermittently thereafter the party engaged in further periods of abstention, to protest against the "illegal" partition of Ireland. In 1965, it agreed to become the official opposition party in the House of Commons.

This was one of the catalysts of the civil rights movement in Northern Ireland. The party became involved in the Derry civil rights march in October 1968, which ended in violence amidst allegations of police brutality. As a result, the party withdrew from its role as official opposition on 15 October 1968, following the controversy of two weeks earlier.

The party developed a reputation for being disorganised and being little more than a collection of elected members with their own local machines. Many calls were made for the party to develop an overall organisation but it fell apart in the late 1960s. Earlier, many members had formed the National Democratic Party (NDP) after attempts at reform failed. The NDP merged into the Social Democratic and Labour Party (SDLP) at that party's foundation in 1970 and many remaining nationalists followed them. One of the Nationalist Party's last electoral contests was the 1973 election for the Assembly created as part of the Sunningdale Agreement. The lack of success in that election meant that the inevitable outcome was obvious, although a handful of councillors were elected to Omagh District Council and Derry City Council in 1973 and 1977. In October 1977, the party merged with Unity to form the Irish Independence Party which also included non-aligned republicans. Although it was successful for a while in capturing the Republican vote, it faded from view due to the rise of Sinn Féin in the early 1980s.

Leaders
Joseph Devlin 1918–1934
Thomas Joseph Campbell 1934–1945
James McSparran 1945–1958
Joseph Francis Stewart 1958–1964
Eddie McAteer 1964–1969
Roderick O'Connor 1969–1972

Following the abolition of Stormont, Eddie McAteer became the effective party leader, while his son Fergus McAteer gradually assumed greater importance.

Electoral performance
See Nationalist Party (Northern Ireland) election results for results in the United Kingdom House of Commons
This chart shows the electoral performance of the Nationalist Party in elections to the Northern Ireland House of Commons

See also
List of Nationalist Party MPs (Ireland)

References

 
Irish nationalist organisations
Political parties established in 1918
Political parties disestablished in 1977
Defunct political parties in Northern Ireland
1918 establishments in Ireland
1977 disestablishments in Northern Ireland